Wayne Community Schools is a school district headquartered in Wayne, Nebraska.

Its schools are Wayne Early Learning Center, Wayne Elementary School, and Wayne Junior-Senior High School.

References

External links
 Wayne Community Schools
Education in Wayne County, Nebraska
School districts in Nebraska